Paratomoxioda is a genus of beetles in the family Mordellidae, containing the following species:

 Paratomoxioda bioculata Franciscolo, 1965
 Paratomoxioda brevis Franciscolo, 1965
 Paratomoxioda capensis Franciscolo, 1965
 Paratomoxioda fenestrata Franciscolo, 1965
 Paratomoxioda grandipalpis Franciscolo, 1965
 Paratomoxioda novemguttata Franciscolo, 1965
 Paratomoxioda testaceipalpis Franciscolo, 1965
 Paratomoxioda testaceiventris (Píc)
 Paratomoxioda unicinata Franciscolo, 1965

References

Mordellidae